Fatongia Paea (born 1 January 2000 in New Zealand) is a New Zealand rugby union player who plays for North Harbour in the National Provincial Championship. His playing position is prop.

Reference list

External links
itsrugby.co.uk profile

2000 births
New Zealand rugby union players
Living people
Rugby union props
Auckland rugby union players
North Harbour rugby union players
Houston SaberCats players